Kothi is a town and a nagar panchayat in Satna district in the Indian state of Madhya Pradesh.

Demographics
 India census, Kothi had a population of 7,710. Males constitute 51% of the population and females 49%. Kothi has an average literacy rate of 62%, higher than the national average of 59.5%: male literacy is 72%, and female literacy is 52%. In Kothi, 17% of the population is under 6 years of age.
Kothi is 20 KM from Satna.

State Highway No. 11 is under construction which passes near the town.

References

Cities and towns in Satna district
Satna